Forest Grove Public School is a school district in McCurtain County, Oklahoma. Its sole school is Forest Grove School in Garvin, which serves PreK-8. As of 1999 it had 123 students.

References

External links
 

Education in McCurtain County, Oklahoma
School districts in Oklahoma